Nadia Bartel (née Coppolino, born 1985) is an Australian model and clothes designer. She is the former wife of retired AFL footballer Jimmy Bartel.

Bartel developed a clothing brand with her sister and another business partner. Inspired by minimalist Scandinavian style, it is called Henne, which means "her" in Swedish. In 2020, Bartel developed a line of tracksuits in earthy colours which became a fashion hit.

She began dating Jimmy Bartel in 2008, and married him on the Bellarine Peninsula in 2014. The couple's first child was born in 2015, and a second son was born in 2018. The couple announced their separation in August 2019. Their divorce was finalised in August 2021.

In September 2021, a viral video circulated of Bartel snorting an unknown white powder off a Kmart plate at a gathering in her home during one of Melbourne's COVID lockdowns.

References

1985 births
Living people
Australian female models
Australian fashion designers
Australian women fashion designers